The Marussia MR03 is a Formula One racing car designed and built by the Marussia F1 Team. It competed for part of the 2014 Formula One season, before the team went into administration in November 2014. Following the team's resurrection as Manor Marussia F1, the car raced as the MR03B after modifications were made to enable it to compete in, and meet the regulations in place for, 2015.

This was the first Formula One car to run on Valvoline lubricant since the Lotus 91 in  despite the MR03 car's fuel was supplied by Shell V-Power.

Marussia MR03

The MR03 was driven in 2014 by Jules Bianchi and Max Chilton, both of whom returned to the team for a second consecutive season. The car was the first car designed by Marussia to use an engine built by Ferrari, the 059/3. In general terms, and compared to previous years' cars, the MR03 performed better relative to the opposition.

As a result of the serious crash that involved Bianchi at the Japanese Grand Prix – and which caused his death nine months later – for the subsequent and inaugural  the team decided to only race with Chilton. This decision was made after the team's initial registration of their reserve driver, American rookie Alexander Rossi. As a further sign of respect and support, the MR03 featured a "#JB17" livery on the sides of the cockpit, being a reference to Bianchi's initials and race number.

After entering into administration in late October 2014, the team did not attend a race event for the first time in its history resulting, therefore, in the MR03 not being fielded at the United States Grand Prix. With the team folding in November 2014, the MR03 did not further participate in the 2014 Formula One season.

Marussia MR03B

Following special FIA permission sought by the Manor-Marussia team in February 2015, the car was modified into the MR03B after basic modifications to meet 2015 regulations, pending a new chassis being built – that ultimately never materialised. The MR03B continued to bear the "#JB17" logo in honour of Jules Bianchi.

Will Stevens and Roberto Merhi were contracted to drive, but the late rescue package meant that the car arrived at the opening round of the season without any form of testing. Ultimately, they did not qualify for the race, as they had not participated in qualifying or any session during the weekend. This was due mostly in part to the team's computers being wiped clean of data in the days leading up to the auction; the oversight went completely undetected by the entire team until the days before the Grand Prix when the car was being assembled in Australia. The team was cleared of any malicious wrongdoing by the FIA after a hearing, and resolved their software issues in time for the next event.

In addition to the new livery, the MR03B also received its first technical updates at the British Grand Prix.

At the 2015 United States Grand Prix, the MR03B featured a further revised livery – adding the stars and the stripes from the flag of the United States  – and a new sponsor Coupons.com, which was introduced with Rossi on his third race for the team. Rossi replaced Merhi for five out of the last seven races of the season, competing in the races that did not clash with his main campaign, in the GP2 Series.

Complete Formula One results
(key)

† Driver failed to finish the race, but was classified as they had completed greater than 90% of the race distance.
‡ Teams and drivers scored double points at the 2014 Abu Dhabi Grand Prix.

References

Marussia Formula One cars
2014 Formula One season cars